Renzo Alverà (January 17, 1933 – March 17, 2005) was an Italian bobsledder who competed from the mid-1950s to the early 1960s. At the 1956 Winter Olympics in Cortina d'Ampezzo, he won silver medals in the two-man and four-man events. He was born in Cortina d'Ampezzo.

Alvera also won seven medals at the FIBT World Championships with six golds (Two-man: 1957, 1958, 1959, 1960; Four-man: 1960, 1961) and one silver (Four-man: 1957).

References
Bobsleigh two-man Olympic medalists 1932-56 and since 1964
Bobsleigh four-man Olympic medalists for 1924, 1932-56, and since 1964
Bobsleigh two-man world championship medalists since 1931
Bobsleigh four-man world championship medalists since 1930

1933 births
2005 deaths
Bobsledders at the 1956 Winter Olympics
Italian male bobsledders
Olympic bobsledders of Italy
Olympic silver medalists for Italy
Olympic medalists in bobsleigh
Medalists at the 1956 Winter Olympics